Earl Faircloth (September 24, 1920 – May 5, 1995) was an American politician and lawyer who served in the Florida House of Representatives and as Attorney General of Florida.

Born in Chiefland, Florida, Faircloth graduated from the University of Florida. He then served in the United States Corps of Engineers during World War II. He then received his law degree from University of Florida College of Law. Faircloth practiced law in Tallahassee, Florida and St. Petersburg, Florida; United States Representative Claude Pepper was a law partner.

Faircloth served in the Florida House of Representatives from 1963 to 1965 and was a Democrat. He then served as Florida Attorney General from 1965 to 1971. Faircloth ran for Florida Governor and the United States Senate and lost the elections. He continued to practice law in Fort Lauderdale, Florida. He died in a hospital in Fort Lauderdale, Florida from a series of strokes and diabetes.

References

University of Florida alumni
Fredric G. Levin College of Law alumni
Democratic Party members of the Florida House of Representatives
Florida Attorneys General
1920 births
1995 deaths
People from Levy County, Florida
United States Army Corps of Engineers personnel
20th-century American lawyers
20th-century American politicians
United States Army personnel of World War II